Jean-Claude Gérard, a flutist born in Angers, he studied with Gaston Crunelle and later with Marcel Moyse studied flute at the Conservatoire National Supérieur de Musique in Paris with Marcel Moyse.

He won several international competitions and began his career in Paris, playing with the Orchestre des Concerts Lamoureux and at the Opéra National de Paris. He moved to Germany in 1972. After his engagement as a solo flutist with the Philharmonic State Orchestra in Hamburg, he was a professor at the Hochschule für Musik und Theater Hannover from 1986 to 1989. Since 1989 he has been professor at the University of Music and performing Arts in Stuttgart. 
Apart from his pedagogic commitments, numerous concerts, recordings, Jean-Claude Gérard is a member of the Deutsche Bläsersolisten, the Ensemble Villa Musica and the Bach-Collegium Stuttgart under the direction of Helmuth Rilling.

References

 Festival features returning favorites Eugene Register-Guard - Google News Archive - Jun 26, 1998 - Quote: Professor at Stuttgart; principal flutist with Paris Opera and solo flutist in Lamoureux france Orchestra..

French classical flautists
French music educators
Year of birth missing (living people)
Living people
People from Angers
Academic staff of the Hochschule für Musik, Theater und Medien Hannover